The 1999 Irish Greyhound Derby took place during August and September with the final being held at Shelbourne Park in Dublin on 18 September 1999. 

The winner Spring Time won £60,000 and was trained and owned by Gerald Watson and bred by Charles Magill. The race was sponsored by the Ireland on Sunday.

Final result 
At Shelbourne, 18 September (over 550 yards):

Distances 
3, 3½, 1, 2, ½, head (lengths)

Competition Report
Chart King returned to Ireland as the winner of the 1999 English Greyhound Derby and 1999 Scottish Greyhound Derby champion and went into the Irish Derby as the 7-2 ante-post favourite. Other leading contenders included English Derby finalist Deerfield Sunset. 
 
Chart King won his first round heat in a fast 30.04. Frisby Full (Reggie Roberts) was fastest in 29.93 and there were also wins for Deerfield Sunset and triple major race winner Borna Survivor, he had already won the Produce Stakes, the Oaks and Dundalk International.

Round two saw Chart King complete sixteen consecutive wins by recording 29.94. Frisby Full won again in 29.96 as did Borna Survivor and Airmount Rover won well. The third round was the exact opposite if the second and the favourites tumbled out of the competition. Borna Survivor and Deerfield Sunset found trouble and were both eliminated behind Lodgefield Jack before Chart King ran poorly and failed to progress; he was retired to stud.

Mr Bozz won the first semi-final from Lodgefield Jack and Airmount Rover with hot favourite Frisby Full encountering trouble and exiting the event. Badge of Tidings completed proceedings in heat two beating Spring Time and Hi Dingle.

Spring Time was a well supported 7-4 favourite in the final after only one defeat in competition (the semi-finals). She justified the odds by winning comfortably by three lengths despite finding a little trouble during the race.

See also
1999 UK & Ireland Greyhound Racing Year

References

Greyhound Derby
Irish Greyhound Derby